John Abbet Walls (September 5, 1879 – May 8, 1964) was an American engineer and businessman, notable as president of the Pennsylvania Water and Power Company.

Education
In 1899, he earned a degree in engineering from the Massachusetts Institute of Technology, located in Cambridge, Massachusetts.

Career
Walls started work at the Niagara Falls Hydraulic Power and Manufacturing Company, located in Niagara Falls, New York.

He became assistant engineer of the Montreal Shawinigan Water and Power Company, located in the Canadian city of Montreal, Quebec, in 1901.

Walls was named chief engineer of the Pennsylvania Water and Power Company. As chief engineer he was involved in dam construction. He was later president of the company.

See also

 List of electrical engineers
 List of Massachusetts Institute of Technology alumni
 List of people from Montreal
 List of people from Niagara Falls, New York
 List of people from Pennsylvania

References

American electrical engineers
American energy industry executives
1879 births
1964 deaths
19th-century births
20th-century deaths
American expatriates in Canada
Businesspeople from Montreal
Businesspeople from New York (state)
Businesspeople from Pennsylvania
MIT School of Engineering alumni
People from Niagara Falls, New York
20th-century American businesspeople
20th-century American engineers